The Men's Slalom in the 2023 FIS Alpine Skiing World Cup consisted of ten events, including the discipline final.  

The season was interrupted by the 2023 World Ski Championships in the linked resorts of Courchevel and Méribel, France from 6–19 February 2023. Although the Alpine Skiing branch of the International Ski Federation (FIS) conducts both the World Cup and the World Championships, the World Championships are organized by nation (a maximum of four skiers is generally permitted per nation), and (after 1970) the results count only for World Championship medals, not for World Cup points. Accordingly, the results in the World Championship are highlighted in blue and shown in this table by ordinal position only in each discipline. The men's slalom was held in Courchevel on 19 February.

Season Summary
Through six races, Lucas Braathen of Norway held a narrow lead over countryman and defending champion Henrik Kristoffersen and Swiss ace Daniel Yule, with each having won twice. In the seventh race, Braathen widened his lead by being the only member of that trio to reach the podium. However, just a few days later, Braathen learned that he had an appendix infection and needed immediate surgery, which forced him to miss the next slalom at Chamonix and potentially the 2023 World Championships, with his return still uncertain post-surgery. 

Braathen did return, although Kristoffersen won the World Championships in slalom with Braathen seventh. Coming into the finals, Braathen was still 32 points ahead of Kristoffersen, meaning that he was assured of the discipline title if he finished no worse than second in the final.  And finishing second was exactly what he did, with Kristoffersen finishing just behind in third, which gave Braathen the season title.  Switzerland's Ramon Zenhäusern won the last race (by 0.06 seconds) to complete the race podium and thus placed third for the season ahead of his countryman Yule, who failed to finish.

The World Cup discipline finals took place on Sunday, 19 March 2023, in Soldeu, Andorra. Only the top 25 in the slalom discipline ranking and the winner of the Junior World Championship were eligible to compete in the final, except that all skiers who have scored at least 500 points in the overall classification were able to compete in any discipline (but none did in slalom). Only the top 15 finishers in each discipline final scored points.

Standings

Legend

DNQ = Did Not Qualify for run 2
DNF1 = Did Not Finish run 1
DSQ1 = Disqualified run 1
DNF2 = Did Not Finish run 2
DSQ2 = Disqualified run 2
DNS2 = Did Not Start run 2

See also
 2023 Alpine Skiing World Cup – Men's summary rankings
 2023 Alpine Skiing World Cup – Men's Overall
 2023 Alpine Skiing World Cup – Men's Downhill
 2023 Alpine Skiing World Cup – Men's Super-G
 2023 Alpine Skiing World Cup – Men's Giant Slalom
 World Cup scoring system

References

External links
 Alpine Skiing at FIS website

Men's slalom
FIS Alpine Ski World Cup slalom men's discipline titles